Hugh II of Cyprus (or Hugues II de Lusignan) (June–August, 1252 or 1253 – November or December 5, 1267) was king of Cyprus and, from the age of 5 years, also Regent of the Kingdom of Jerusalem.

Biography
On January 18, 1253, at the age of two months, he succeeded his father Henry I as king of Cyprus, with his mother, Queen Plaisance, acting as regent, and was crowned at Santa Sophia, Nicosia, later in that year. Although he had only a weaker claim to the Kingdom of Jerusalem, many felt that he was a better candidate (living in a Crusader state close to the Palestinian coast) than Conradin, the Hohenstaufen claimant who was also a child but absent in Europe (Hugh II was second in order of succession, right after Conradin himself, since he was the son of the only surviving son of Alice of Champagne, the second surviving daughter of Queen Isabella I of Jerusalem and thus Conradin's great-grandaunt). In 1258 John of Ibelin, lord of Jaffa, and Bohemund VI of Antioch brought Hugh and Plaisance to Acre, where Hugh was set up as regent for Conradin, and Plaisance was chosen to carry out Hugh’s regency while he remained underage, becoming Lord of Jerusalem.

In 1261, Plaisance died and the regency of Cyprus passed to Hugh of Antioch-Lusignan, Hugh II's 25-year-old first cousin. His mother, Hugh II's younger aunt Isabella of Lusignan became acting regent of Jerusalem in Acre. Hugh II died in Nicosia in November 1267 at the age of 14 and was buried in the Dominican Church in Nicosia. He had been betrothed and was possibly married at Nicosia in 1264/1265 to Isabella of Ibelin (ca. 1252 – Beirut, 1282/1283 and buried there), Lady of Beirut 1264, but the marriage was never consummated. He was succeeded by Hugh of Lusignan-Antioch (son of his younger aunt Isabella) as Hugh III of Cyprus, though his heir-general was another first cousin, Hugh of Brienne (c. 1240–1296), son of Mary of Cyprus, the eldest aunt of the deceased Hugh II. This claim fell to his son Walter V of Brienne and his descendants. They are the heirs-general of King Amalric I of Cyprus.

It has often been claimed that 1266 Thomas Aquinas dedicated his work De regimine principum ("On the Government of Rulers") to Hugh II, but in view of the strong argument by Christoph Flüeler (Rezeption und Interpretation der Aristotelischen “Politica” im späten Mittelalter, Bochumer Studien zur Philosophie, 19 (Amsterdam and Philadelphia: B.R. Grüner, 1992), 2v.;  v.1, 23–29.) for redating the work to 1271–73, it now seems likely that it was written for his successor Hugh III (1267–84). Later works, such as Panos Leventis' Twelve Times in Nicosia. Nicosia, Cyprus, 1192-1570: Topography, Architecture and Urban Experience in a Diversified Capital City (Nicosia: Cyprus Research Center, 2005, pp. 49, 51) argue for the earlier dating and the work's dedication to Hugh II, based on a perceived "formative" understanding of Aristotelian works by Aquinas, i.e. prior to 1265.

References
Hans E. Mayer, The Crusades. Oxford, 1965.

Kings of Cyprus
13th-century monarchs in the Middle East
13th-century people of the Kingdom of Jerusalem
13th-century viceregal rulers
Medieval child monarchs
1253 births
1267 deaths
13th century in Cyprus
Regents of Jerusalem
Monarchs who died as children